Robert Ferrigno (born 1947) is an American author of crime novels and of speculative fiction. Eight books published between 1990 and 2004 were additions to the detective and thriller genres, while the post 9/11 'Assassin trilogy' is set in an imagined United States dominated by Islam.

In February 2009 he was nominated as a finalist for an Edgar Award and has been reviewed by the LA Times and the New York Times for his book Prayers for the Assassin.

Novels
 The Horse Latitudes (1990), his first
 Cheshire Moon (1993)
 Dead Man's Dance (1995)
 Dead Silent (1996)
 Heartbreaker (1999)
 Flinch (2001)
 Scavenger Hunt (2003)
 The Wake-Up (2004)
 Prayers for the Assassin (2006)
 Sins of the Assassin (2008)
 Heart of the Assassin (2009)
 The Girl Who Cried Wolf (2013)

References

External links

Author's Website
Author profile at Simon & Schuster
Interview in January Magazine

1947 births
20th-century American novelists
21st-century American novelists
American male novelists
American mystery writers
Living people
20th-century American male writers
21st-century American male writers